Begonia francisabuidii is a species of flowering plant in the family Begoniaceae, native to the Philippines, with specimens spotted in Albay. It is characterized by reddish wood and white flowers. It is named after Francis Abuid, a Filipino biologist who died in a vehicular accident in 2021.

References

francisabuidii
Plants described in 2022